Basilica Minore dei Santi Filippo e Giacomo is a Catholic basilica located in Cortina d'Ampezzo, Italy. It is dedicated to the Apostles Philip and James, patron saint of Cortina d'Ampezzo. It is the home of the parish and the deanery of Cortina d'Ampezzo. Built between 1769 and 1775 in the Baroque style to a design by the architect Joseph Promperg, it sits on the site where two previous churches had existed from the 13th and 16th centuries.

References

Sources
 AA. VV., Pietre Vive, Edizioni La Cooperativa di Cortina, Cortina d'Ampezzo, 2011. 
 Karl Wolfsgruber, La Chiesa Parrocchiale dei SS. Filippo e Giacomo di Cortina d'Ampezzo, Foto Ghedina, Cortina d'Ampezzo, 1975. 

Roman Catholic churches completed in 1775
Minor basilicas in Veneto
Buildings and structures in Cortina d'Ampezzo
18th-century Roman Catholic church buildings in Italy
Baroque architecture in Veneto